Anthony Irby may refer to:

Anthony Irby (died 1625), English Master of Chancery, Recorder and MP of Boston
Anthony Irby (1577–1610), his son, (English Member of Parliament?)
Anthony Irby (1605–1682), English Member of Parliament for Boston